Leopold Müller (born 9 January 1908 in Salzburg, died 1 August 1988 in Salzburg) was a geologist, one of the pioneers of rock mechanics and one of the main contributors to the development of the New Austrian Tunnelling method.

Austrian civil engineers
1908 births
1988 deaths
People from Salzburg